This is a list of the 2023 Professional Darts Corporation calendar of events with player progression documented from the quarterfinals stage where applicable.

The list includes European tour events, Players Championships events, World Series of Darts events and PDC majors. It also includes PDC secondary tours (Challenge Tour, Development Tour, and Women's Series) as well as PDC affiliate tours (Championship Darts Circuit, Dartplayers Australia, Dartplayers New Zealand, PDC Asia and PDC Nordic & Baltic) and PDC qualifying events.

January

February

March

April

May

June

July

August

September

October

November

December

See also
2023 PDC Pro Tour

References

External links
Professional Darts Corporation Ltd. – official website

Professional Darts Corporation
2023 in darts